Baccharis brachyphylla is a North American species of shrub in the family Asteraceae, known by the common name shortleaf baccharis or false willow. It is native to the southwestern United States (southern California, southern Nevada, Arizona, southern New Mexico, and western Texas) and northern Mexico (Baja California, Chihuahua, Sonora). It grows in desert habitats such as arroyos and canyons.

This is a shrub producing erect, branching green stems up to a meter tall. The inflorescence is a wide array of flower heads. A dioecious species, the male and female plants produce different flower types which are similar in appearance. The flowers and foliage are glandular.

References

External links
Jepson Manual Treatment for Baccharis brachyphylla

brachyphylla
Natural history of the Colorado Desert
Natural history of the Mojave Desert
Plants described in 1853
North American desert flora
Flora of the Southwestern United States
Flora of the South-Central United States
Flora of Northwestern Mexico
Flora of Northeastern Mexico
Flora without expected TNC conservation status